Cochranella granulosa (common name: grainy Cochran frog, in Spanish ranita de cristal) is a species of frog in the family Centrolenidae.
It is found in Costa Rica, Honduras, Nicaragua, and Panama.

Cochranella granulosa is a nocturnal, arboreal frog found in humid lowland and montane forests. It is typically found in vegetation near streams. Eggs are deposited on vegetation over streams, and the tadpoles drop to water upon hatching. This species is negatively impacted by habitat loss (deforestation) and water pollution.

References

granulosa
Amphibians of Costa Rica
Amphibians of Honduras
Amphibians of Nicaragua
Amphibians of Panama
Amphibians described in 1949
Frogs of North America
Taxa named by Edward Harrison Taylor
Taxonomy articles created by Polbot